2020 is a studio album by avant-garde folk musician Richard Dawson, released on 11 October 2019 by Domino Recording Company. Like its 2017 predecessor, Peasant, each song on the album is from the perspective of a different fictional narrator. Through these individual perspectives, 2020 explores the broad social attitudes and anxieties of modern British citizens. The album's press release describes Britain as "an island country in a state of flux; a society on the edge of mental meltdown".

Reception 
2020 received acclaim from music critics. At Metacritic, which assigns a normalized rating out of 100 to reviews from mainstream critics, the album received an average score of 82 based on fifteen reviews, indicating "universal acclaim".

Track listing 
All tracks are written by Richard Dawson.

References

Richard Dawson (musician) albums
Domino Recording Company albums
2019 albums